Khurvin (also Romanized as Khūrvīn and Khowrvīn; also known as Khūrdīn and Khurūran) is a village in Chendar Rural District, Chendar District, Savojbolagh County, Alborz Province, Iran. At the 2006 census, its population was 866, in 261 families.

Ganj Tape 
Two ancient mounds named  and Siyah Tappeh are located near the village. The former of which is listed in the list of Iranian national heritage sites with the registration number 10827 on 22 January 2004.

Gallery

References 

Populated places in Savojbolagh County